"The Supremes" is the seventeenth episode of the fifth season of American serial political drama television series The West Wing. It originally aired on NBC on March 24, 2004. In "The Supremes", the White House senior staff, under Democratic President Josiah Bartlet, looks to nominate a judge to the Supreme Court of the United States when Josh comes up with a plan to, instead of nominating a centrist to the seat, nominate one liberal and one conservative candidate to two seats on the Court. The episode was met with mixed reception, although it was later noted the show bore similarities to the 2016 death and replacement of real-life Supreme Court Justice Antonin Scalia.

Plot 
The story in "The Supremes" begins at the end of the previous episode, entitled "Eppur Si Muove", after Josh Lyman's attempt to pack the United States circuit courts ends with news of the death of Owen Brady, a fifty-two year old Justice on the Supreme Court of the United States. In the current episode, the White House senior staff works to find a replacement for Brady, taking interviews with judges who are considered potential nominees to fill the seat. Josh and Toby Ziegler take a meeting with Evelyn Baker Lang, a liberal U.S. circuit court judge, although Lang is not seriously considered as a potential candidate. Instead, Lang is brought in as a diversion, with Josh and Toby hoping that when rumors spread that the White House is considering Lang, the United States Senate Committee on the Judiciary, which is controlled by the Republican Party and has the power to block judicial nominees, will be frightened into easily passing a more moderate candidate.

However, Josh is impressed by his meeting with Lang, in which she correctly deduces the meeting's role as a political tactic and demonstrates in-depth knowledge of the Senate Judiciary Committee. Josh wants to put Lang on the court, but after she tells him and Toby that she had a legal abortion in law school, the senior staff argues that nominating her for the seat would be harmful to both her and the White House's public image. President Bartlet insists that Lang's name be put on the shortlist anyway, although he agrees with Leo McGarry that the probable nominee is going to be E. Bradford Shelton, a moderate. Shelton is brought into the White House to meet the President, where he tells the President that "I don't position myself on issues... my allegiance to the eccentricities of a case will reliably outweigh any position you might wish I held," confirming that he would not consistently vote with the incumbent Chief Justice of the United States, liberal Roy Ashland.

Donna Moss, talking to Josh in her cubicle, shows Josh a tin of cookies given to her by her parents, with a picture of her parents' two cats taped to the top. She explains that when her parents went looking to buy a cat, they disagreed on which cat to buy, leading each parent to buy the one they like and live together with both cats. Josh, inspired by the story, proposes a strategy to Toby; Lang will be nominated to be the first female Chief Justice, in exchange for offering the Senate Judiciary Committee the opportunity to select a conservative to fill Brady's seat. Toby disagrees, but when Josh goes to tell his idea to the President, Toby follows him, leading to an argument between the two outside the Oval Office. While Toby argues that the White House might have the opportunity to nominate someone else to the Chief Justice's position, letting the White House select both candidates, Josh reminds him that both candidates would then be moderates. Toby responds that moderate justices are more deliberate and less eager for attention, but Josh argues that "if we had a bench full of moderates in '54, separate but equal would still be on the books, this place would still have two sets of drinking fountains".

Josh and Toby go to Roy Ashland to propose the idea, to which the Chief Justice laughingly tells them to go ahead, and "see what segregationist, anti-miscegenationist, Isaiah-quoting gay-bashing bastard they come up with." When Josh goes to Lisa Wolfe, the Republican staff director for the Senate Judiciary Committee, she gives him the name Christopher Mulready as the committee's choice for Brady's seat. Toby immediately objects, characterizing Mulready as "The man [who] wrote a book that flushes the entire doctrine of enumerated rights down the … the garbage disposal! No right to use a condom. No right to get an abortion, certainly. No protection from electronic searches. No substantive due process." Bartlet is similarly unreceptive to Mulready's appointment. After some time, though, Toby comes back into Josh's office, expressing reluctant support for his plan.

Judges Mulready and Lang are both brought in to the White House to meet with President Bartlet. While Toby is waiting with Mulready in the Roosevelt Room, the two argue over the constitutionality of the Defense of Marriage Act, and when Lang joins the conversation, she informs Toby that Mulready was merely "yanking [his] chain", as Mulready was already opposed to the law because it was an overreach of federal power over the states. Mulready and Lang begin to debate on a second topic, but Mulready is then brought into the Oval Office. Mulready is unimpressed by Bartlet's inclination to nominate Brad Shelton, quipping that "in the event that Carmine, Lafayette, Hoyte, Clark, and Brannigan all drop dead, the center will still be well tended." Mulready argues that "the Court was at its best when Brady was fighting Ashland", and when Bartlet responded that moderation has created good law in the past, Mulready counters that ideology and principle have lain the foundation for future shifts in perspective from the Court.

Bartlet, impressed, agrees to nominate both Mulready and Lang to the Supreme Court. The final scene depicts the White House press corps giving a standing ovation as Bartlet announces his nominees.

Cast

Reaction and influence 
Reception for the episode was mixed. In 2016, Brian Lowry with Variety likened the 2004 episode to the then-current controversy around the death of Supreme Court Justice Antonin Scalia and the nomination of Merrick Garland, citing it as an example of how a President and Senate of opposed parties could work out their differences. Lowry, however, also dismissed the plot as unrealistic, along with the praiseworthy notion that characters who disagreed politically could act out of ideological principle.

Lisa McElroy with Slate also compared "The Supremes" to Garland and Scalia in an article entitled "This West Wing Episode Predicted the Controversy Around Scalia's Replacement in Eerie Detail", noting that various quotes from the episode could be read as tributes to Scalia's memory instead of Brady's despite Scalia's death occurring twelve years afterward. McElroy covers some of the episode sarcastically, writing that the White House senior staff are "our Sorkin-created superheroes... They might not be able to keep the president from getting MS, or his daughter from getting kidnapped, but this Supreme Court maneuver? All in a day's work." However, she does praise the debate scene between Lang and Mulready, noting that both participants seemed to gain knowledge and insight from the conversation and comparing it to the friendship between Scalia and fellow Justice Ruth Bader Ginsburg. McElroy noted that the episode felt true to the style of Aaron Sorkin, the show's creator who had left the show at the end of the previous season.

References

External links
 

The West Wing (season 5) episodes
2004 American television episodes